Perelazovsky is a rural locality (a khutor) and the administrative center of Perelazovskoye Rural Settlement, Kletsky District, Volgograd Oblast, Russia. The population was 1,045 as of 2010. There are 23 streets.

Geography 
Perelazovsky is located in steppe, on the Kurtlak River, 45 km southwest of Kletskaya (the district's administrative centre) by road. Novotsaritsynsky is the nearest rural locality.

References 

Rural localities in Kletsky District